Gildo Lourenço Vilanculos (born 31 January 1995) is a Mozambican professional footballer who plays as a winger for Sporting Covilhã.

Football career
Gildo Vilanculos started is professional career on the Mozambican club Ferroviário.

On 10 January 2017, Gildo signed a four-and-a-half contract with Marítimo.

He made his international debut for Mozambique in September 2015 against Mauritius, and scored his first international goal in March 2022 against Niger.

References

External links
 

1995 births
Living people
People from Beira, Mozambique
Mozambican footballers
Association football wingers
Clube Ferroviário da Beira players
Mozambique international footballers
C.S. Marítimo players
Real S.C. players
Amora F.C. players
S.C. Covilhã players
Primeira Liga players
Liga Portugal 2 players
Campeonato de Portugal (league) players
Mozambican expatriate footballers
Expatriate footballers in Portugal
Mozambican expatriate sportspeople in Portugal